Porte-des-Bonnevaux is a commune in the Isère department in southeastern France. It was established on 1 January 2019 by merger of the former communes of Semons (the seat), Arzay, Commelle and Nantoin.

See also
Communes of the Isère department

References

Communes of Isère
States and territories established in 2019